Eversley Centre is a village in the Hart District of Hampshire, England. Its nearest town is Yateley, approximately 2 miles (2.5 km) away from the village. It is in the civil parish of Eversley.

Villages in Hampshire